Samtse College of Education, a constituent college of the Royal University of Bhutan, is one of the two institutes in the country offering undergraduate degree programmes in education and post graduate diplomas in education. The college is in Samtse, Bhutan.

It was founded in 1968 as the Teacher Training Institute by King Jigme Dorji Wangchuk, the third king of Bhutan. It was renamed in 1983 to National Institute of Education and was changed to Samtse College of Education in 2003 when it became part of the Royal University of Bhutan.

Kaylzang Tshering became director in 2008.

External links
 College home page
 

Universities in Bhutan
Colleges in Bhutan
Educational institutions established in 1960
1960 establishments in Bhutan